Sutherland High School may refer to:

Sutherland High School, Centurion
Heywood Community High School, formerly named Sutherland High School
Pittsford Sutherland High School